"Doretta's Dream" is a 1987 single by Sarah Brightman. The song is based on the aria "Chi il bel sogno di Doretta" ("Doretta's Beautiful Dream") from Giacomo Puccini's opera La Rondine. New English lyrics were written by Charles Hart.

Track listing 
 "Doretta's Dream" (Theme from A Room with a View)
 "O mio babbino caro"

References 

1987 singles
Sarah Brightman songs
Songs with lyrics by Charles Hart (lyricist)
Polydor Records singles
1987 songs